Manga Entertainment was a producer, licensee, and distributor of anime in the United States and the United Kingdom. Originally founded in the UK in 1987, the UK branch  became Funimation UK and Ireland in 2021, also currently known as Crunchyroll Ltd. since 2022, while its U.S. branch was absorbed into Starz Inc. (now owned by Lionsgate).
 
Despite its name, the company's principal business was the distribution of anime rather than manga, although they have published some manga (such as Crying Freeman) under the Manga Books imprint.

History 

Manga Entertainment (formerly Island World Communications) was founded in London in 1991 by Chris Blackwell and Laurence Guinness  as a subsidiary of Island Records' Island World Group. IWC took over the company number for Golden Square Music, but had no relationship to IWC or Manga. Manga Entertainment expanded into North America in 1993 with the purchase of L.A. Hero, forming Manga U.S. while Manga UK entered the Australian market in late 1993 and began releasing titles in January 1994 in conjunction with the Australian division of Island's parent company, PolyGram and local independent distributor Siren Entertainment.

On May 13, 2004, IDT Entertainment announced they would purchase Manga U.S., becoming a subsidiary of IDT Entertainment. In 2005, Manga UK and Manga U.S. began to operate independently from each other, but still remain under the same ownership. Liberty Media would then purchase IDT Entertainment in 2006 and would be renamed as Starz Media.

In 2011, Manga U.S. ceased licensing new products after the release of Redline and was absorbed into Starz Media. On August 8, 2012, Liberty Media announced that it would spin-off Starz Media into a separate publicly traded company. The spin-off of Starz Inc. was completed on January 15, 2013 which included all subsidiaries.

2015–present 
On February 26, 2015, the UK branch was acquired from Starz Media, alongside its parent Anchor Bay UK, by managing director Colin Lomax. Anchor Bay UK was renamed to Platform Entertainment and went on to have exclusive rights to the Manga Entertainment branding and catalog in the UK and Ireland.

In June 2016, Lionsgate announced they would acquire Starz Inc. which would eventually be completed in December 2016, placing Manga U.S. under Lionsgate Home Entertainment. In the same month, Kaleidoscope Film Distribution announced they had purchased Platform Entertainment and confirmed that they would split Manga UK off to become separately operated.

In 2017, Lionsgate Home Entertainment relaunched Manga U.S.' website and Facebook and Twitter page, and confirmed a re-launch in the near future. Lionsgate currently licenses the Manga Entertainment brand-name from the UK branch. As of January 2023, the relaunch has yet to happen, with some of Manga's titles like Ghost in the Shell being rereleased under the main Lionsgate banner.

See also 
 Manga Force: The Ultimate Collection

References

External links 
 
 

 
1987 establishments in England
1991 establishments in California
2011 disestablishments in California
2021 disestablishments in England
American companies disestablished in 2011
American companies established in 1991
Anime companies
British companies disestablished in 2021
British companies established in 1987
Defunct entertainment companies
Defunct mass media companies of the United States
Former Liberty Media subsidiaries
Lionsgate subsidiaries
Mass media companies established in 1987
Mass media companies established in 1991
Starz Entertainment Group